Jaisingrao Rane  is an Indian politician and member of the Maharashtrawadi Gomantak Party. Rane was a member of the Goa Legislative Assembly in 1967 from the Thivim constituency in North Goa. He was elected from 
Pernem in 1972.

References 

People from North Goa district
Goa, Daman and Diu MLAs 1967–1972
Living people
Maharashtrawadi Gomantak Party politicians
Year of birth missing (living people)
Goa, Daman and Diu MLAs 1972–1977